"It's Only Money" is a song by British singer Roland Gift. The song serves as the lead single of the singer's debut solo album, Roland Gift. The song was released on 4 March in the United Kingdom - where it debuted at number 123 on the UK Singles Chart.

Track listing
"It's Only Money" (Album Version)
"Love's Not Enough" (Album Version)
"It's Only Money" (Instrumental)

Charts

References

2002 singles
Songs written by Roland Gift